Clepsis balcanica is a species of moth of the family Tortricidae. It is found in Albania, Bosnia and Herzegovina, Serbia, Bulgaria, Romania and North Macedonia.

The wingspan is 16–19 mm for males and about 18 mm for females. Adults have been recorded on wing from June to July.

References

Moths described in 1917
Clepsis